Scenella is an extinct genus of fossil invertebrate animal which is generally considered to be a mollusc; at various times it has been suggested that this genus belongs with the gastropods, the monoplacophorans, or the helcionellids, although no firm association with any of these classes has been established.  An affinity with the hydrozoa (as a flotation device) has been considered, although some authors oppose this hypothesis.  A gastropod affinity is defended on the basis of six pairs of internal muscle scars, whilst the serially-repeated nature of these scars suggests to other authors a monoplacophoran affinity.  However the specimens showing this scarring have not been convincingly shown to belong to the genus Scenella. A similarity to the Ediacaran Ovatoscutum has also been drawn.

Description
The shell of Scenella is elongated along its anterior-posterior axis, and comprises concentric rings around a conical central peak.  Radial and concentric corrugations exist in some species.  Some specimens are preserved as organic films, others appear to have been infilled with calcite.  They are usually preserved point-upwards, with their long axes consistently oriented; this probably represents their most stable position under their depositional current.  Soft parts have never been reported in association with Scenella, suggesting that the preserved fragments separated quickly from the associated tissue prior to burial.

Fossil occurrence 

Scenella lived from the Cambrian to the Ordovician. Its remains have been found in Antarctica, Asia, Europe, and North America.  Individual fossils are common throughout the Burgess shale, where they often occur in dense aggregations.   Where they overlap, specimens deform as by draping.  Specimens are sometimes cracked or torn, with margins often damaged by folding or "tattering".  1206 specimens of Scenella are known from the Greater Phyllopod bed, where they comprise 2.29% of the community.

Taxonomy 

Scenella is the only genus in the family Scenellidae. This family has no subfamilies and Scenella is the type genus of the family Scenellidae.

The taxonomy of the Gastropoda by Bouchet & Rocroi, 2005 categorizes Scenellidae in the superfamilia Scenelloidea within the Paleozoic molluscs of uncertain systematic position.

Species 
Species in the genus Scenella include:

References

External links 
 

Scenella at the Field Museum's Evolving Planet

Burgess Shale fossils
Scenellidae
Prehistoric mollusc genera
Cambrian invertebrates
Ordovician invertebrates
Extinct animals of Antarctica
Paleozoic animals of Asia
Prehistoric animals of Europe
Paleozoic animals of North America
Cambrian Series 2 first appearances
Late Ordovician extinctions
Paleozoic life of Ontario
Paleozoic life of Newfoundland and Labrador
Paleozoic life of Quebec
Taxa named by Elkanah Billings